Mwansekwa is an administrative ward in the Mbeya Urban district of the Mbeya Region of Tanzania. In 2016 the Tanzania National Bureau of Statistics report there were 1,987 people in the ward, from 1,803 in 2012.

Neighborhoods 
The ward has 4 neighborhoods.
 Ilembo
 Luwala
 Mengo
 Mwanzumbo

References 

Wards of Mbeya Region